Tenorio Volcano National Park is a National Park in the northern part of Costa Rica, which forms part of the Arenal Tempisque Conservation Area. The jewel of the National Park is the Tenorio Volcano, from which it receives its name. The volcano was made part of the National Park in 1995 and is located about 26 miles northeast from the town of Fortuna in the Guanacaste Province.

The Rio Celeste appears blue due to the emission of sulphur from the volcano and precipitation of calcium carbonate. Thermal springs and small geysers dot the area as do rivers, waterfalls, lagoons and places providing panoramic views.  The upper area of the park is dominated by primary cloud forest, while the lower regions are carpeted with rain forest. The tapir and the rarely seen puma reside in the area.

There is a ranger station at the base of the volcano that provides visitors with basic information. The volcano's summit can be reached via the Lago Las Dantas Trail, which winds up the volcano and passes through forested terrain before eventually reaching the peak.

Tenorio Volcano National Park adjoins Tenorio Valley Nature Reserve, a former cattle ranch that was rewilded in 2004. The 20-acre wetland within the nature reserve is the only known location of the Tapir Valley tree frog (Tlalocohyla celeste).

Refer

External links 
 Tenorio Volcano National Park at Costa Rica National Parks

National parks of Costa Rica
Protected areas established in 1976
Geography of Guanacaste Province
Tourist attractions in Guanacaste Province
1976 establishments in Costa Rica